Summerlin is a surname. Notable people with the surname include:

Ed Summerlin (1928–2006), American composer, jazz saxophonist and music educator
George T. Summerlin (1872–1947), United States Army officer and diplomat
Jacob Summerlin (1820–1893), Florida cattleman, founder of Orlando
Mark Summerlin (born 1970), American songwriter
Robert L. Summerlin, American judge and politician
Sam Summerlin (1928–2017), American journalist and writer
William Summerlin (born 1938), American dermatologist